Bembridge Lifeboat Station is an RNLI station located in the village of Bembridge on the Isle of Wight in the United Kingdom.

Location 

The station is located on the eastern approaches to the Solent Estuary, south of the area known as Spithead. The station is on one of the busiest shipping lanes in United Kingdom waters.

The main boathouse stands away from the shore on a piled platform with slipway, and is linked to the shore by means of a gangway. The station operates two lifeboats. The second is an Inshore lifeboat (ILB) and is a  called . The ILB is kept in a boathouse on the shore next to the pier head of the main boathouse gangway.

History

1867–1922: original service and rescues 
The first lifeboat service began at Bembridge in 1867. A boathouse was built at Lane End at a cost of £165, and the first lifeboat was launched from here by means of a carriage. She was paid for by the subscriptions of the citizens of Worcester and was named . A rowing boat, also operated from Bembridge from 1887 to 1902. She was replaced that year by a second lifeboat, also named the Queen Victoria. The first boathouse was enlarged between 1902 and 1903.On 3 February 1916 the SS Empress Queen became stranded in thick fog and foul weather on the Ring Rocks, off the Foreland at the eastern extremity of the Isle of Wight. There were 1,300 troops and a large quantity of ammunition on board. A destroyer was used to take off the troops while the crew remained on board. Efforts to pull the Empress Queen off the rocks failed, and within a few hours a gale had blown up. The Queen Victoria II launched to assist but was unable to anchor nearby, instead retrieving a line from the Empress Queen. Over four trips, the Queen Victoria II rescued 110 crewmen, and the ship's cat and dog.

On the morning of 28 August 1919, there was heavy rain in a strong gale, and American ship called the  had been driven onto a shoal at West Wittering. The Queen Victoria II got alongside her and rescued 13 of her crew, then returned to stand by while a government tug towed her in. The lifeboat coxswain was awarded an RNLI Silver Medal.

1922–1939: improvements 
By 1922 the RNLI had determined that Bembridge's location made it a prime candidate for a new motor lifeboat, requiring the construction of a new boathouse with a concrete pier and a steel launching slipway. The 1922 improvements made Bembridge the most state of the art station in the country and gave the crew the capability to be at sea in just 14 minutes. The new motor lifeboat extended the range of the station, allowing Bembridge to cover Brook and Brighstone, whose stations were closed.

She was funded by a legacy and christened by the Bishop of Salisbury, Neville Lovett, on 21 July 1939. Jesse Lumb'''s service at Bembridge ended in 1970.

On 29 January 1940 there was a blizzard with heavy seas in the English Channel. The Jesse Lumb  put out to sea at 5:20 pm in response to a distress call. She searched Man's Fort just off Selsey, then was redirected to search between Ryde and Seaview on the Isle of Wight. Finding no vessels in distress, she was redirected to Chichester Bar outside Chichester Harbour, where she finally located HMT Kingston Cairngorm, which was flooding quickly. After several approaches, the Jesse Lumb retrieved all 21 of her crew safely. The lifeboat coxswain was awarded an RNLI Bronze Medal.

The station's lifeboats continued to serve during World War II. On 8 August 1941, Jesse Lumb was launched to search for an aircraft reported to be down 10 miles south of Bembridge station. After a fruitless search for the aircraft, the lifeboat came across Royal Air Force Marine Branch high speed launch HSL 116 disabled and flying a distress signal. She had been attacked by German aircraft while on patrol. One crewman had been killed, another severely wounded, and the launch's propeller was fouled. The Jesse Lumb took the vessel under tow and brought her safely in to Portsmouth.

 1964–1994: boathouse enlargements 
In 1964 the RNLI established an inshore lifeboat service at Bembridge, utilising the 1867 boathouse to house the D-class ILB. In 1987 the station was allocated a new  lifeboat, and the boathouse was again altered to accommodate the bigger boat. She was on the station from 1987 until 2010. In 1989 work was done on the slipway to extend the toe, and in 1994 major repairs were made to the slipway.

 2009: major re-development 
In 2009 a new Tamar-class lifeboat lifeboat was allocated to the station, again requiring a major redevelopment of the offshore boathouse, projected to cost £10 million. A public appeal to raise £1 million for the project was launched. Demolition of the old station began in May 2009.

The facility was designed to allow the lifeboat to reach 95% of casualties within 50 miles of the station, within 30 minutes of launch. The portion of the structure dating back to the original 19th century boathouse were kept. The new boathouse, station and gangway was completed by October 2010 and cost £7,650,000.

Fleet

All Weather lifeboats

Inshore lifeboats

Gallery

Neighbouring Station Locations

References 

Lifeboat stations on the Isle of Wight
Organisations based on the Isle of Wight
Buildings and structures on the Isle of Wight
Bembridge